The banded yellow robin or olive-yellow robin (Gennaeodryas placens) is a species of bird in the Australasian robin family Petroicidae that is found in New Guinea. It is the only species in the genus Gennaeodryas. Its natural habitats are subtropical or tropical moist lowland forest and subtropical or tropical moist montane forest.
It is threatened by habitat loss. It has a high mortality rate due to its inability to traverse across a matrix.

Taxonomy
The banded yellow robin was described by the Australian zoologist, Edward Pierson Ramsay, in 1879, from a specimen collected in southeastern New Guinea. He coined the binomial name Eopsaltria placens. The species was subsequently placed in the genus Poecilodryas. It was moved to the resurrected genus Gennaeodryas, based on the results of a molecular phylogenetic study published in 2011. The genus Gennaeodryas had been introduced by the Australian ornithologist, Gregory Mathews, in 1920. The genus name combines the Ancient Greek gennaios 'noble' or 'high-born' with dryad 'tree-nymph'. The specific epithet placens is the Latin word for 'charming' or 'pleasing'.

References

 del Hoyo, J.; Elliot, A. & Christie D. (editors). (2007). Handbook of the Birds of the World. Volume 12: Picathartes to Tits and Chickadees. Lynx Edicions. 

Birds of New Guinea
banded yellow robin
Taxonomy articles created by Polbot